Tilia nasczokinii Stepanov, commonly known as Nasczokin's lime or Nasczokin's linden, is a rare deciduous tree or shrub endemic to Siberia in Russia.

Description

The tree grows to 20 m tall, its bark pale grey and fissured. The leaves are cordate or broadly ovate, up to 15 cm long.  The tiny yellowish, almost white flowers of 0.8–1 cm in diameter appear in clusters of 1–3. The stigmata are stellate, and the ovary is strip-hairy. Long hairs and short hairs grow in longitudinal, alternating rows. The young ovary is white haired and becomes rusty upon maturity. The fruit is flattened.

Ecology
The habitat of Tilia nasczokinii is coniferous forests of Pinus sylvestris.

Cultivation
The tree is not known to be in cultivation in western Europe or North America.

Etymology
The tree is named for the Russian botanist Vladimir D. Nashchokin, who studied it.

Conservation status
Tilia nasczokinii is considered a threatened species and included in the Red Book of Krasnoyarsk Krai.
One locus is in the conservation zone of the Stolby Nature Sanctuary.

References

External links

nasczokinii
Endemic flora of Russia
Flora of Asia
Trees of Siberia
Trees of Russia